Louisiana Woman, Mississippi Man is the third collaborative studio album by Conway Twitty and Loretta Lynn. It was released on July 9, 1973, by MCA Records.

Critical reception

In the July 21, 1973 issue, Billboard published a review of the album, which said that "Each time they sing together, they make even better music. Good close harmony throughout. Once again, an excellent selection of songs, under the guiding hand of the old master, Owen Bradley, plus his superb production. This team just mixes well, and fans of both will be pleased with the results." The review noted "For Heaven's Sake", "Easy on My Mind", "As Good as a Lonely Girl Can Be", and "What Are We Gonna Do About Us" as the best cuts on the album. It also included a note to dealers, saying that "Despite an unflattering picture of Miss Lynn on the cover, their total fans are legion, and this could outsell all the others."

The review in the July 21, 1973 issue of Cashbox said, "This is a super album from possibly the greatest country duo that ever stepped into a pair of matching Tony Lama boots. What makes them great is the quality of their vocals, the insight and depth of feeling they bring to each song (they mean every word they sing), and the diversity of their material. Each song is different, and each one stands tall. No "sameness." Heavy cuts, recommended for airplay include: "Bye Bye Love", "Living Together Alone", "If You Touch Me", "What Are We Gonna Do About Us," "As Good as a Lonely Girl Can Be," and natch, the title cut."

Commercial performance
The album peaked at No. 1 on the US Billboard Hot Country LPs chart, becoming the duo's first album to top the chart. The album also peaked at No. 153 on the US Billboard Top LPs & Tape chart.

The album's only single, "Louisiana Woman, Mississippi Man", was released in May 1973 and also peaked at No. 1 on the US Billboard Hot Country Singles chart, the duo's third consecutive single to top the chart. In Canada, the single peaked at No. 1 on the RPM Country Singles chart, the duo's second single to top the chart.

Recording 
Recording sessions for the album took place at Bradley's Barn in Mount Juliet, Tennessee, beginning on March 6 and 7, 1973. Three additional sessions followed on April 3, 4 and 5.

Track listing

Personnel
Adapted from the album liner notes and Decca recording session records.
Harold Bradley – bass guitar
Owen Bradley – producer
Ray Edenton – acoustic guitar
John Hughey – steel
Darrel Johnson - mastering
Loretta Lynn – lead vocals
Tommy Markham – drums
Grady Martin – guitar
Bob Moore – bass
The Nashville Sounds – background vocals
Hargus Robbins – piano
Conway Twitty – lead vocals

Charts
Album

Singles

References 

1973 albums
Vocal duet albums
Conway Twitty albums
Loretta Lynn albums
Albums produced by Owen Bradley
MCA Records albums